The John Mellencamp Pavilion is the primary indoor athletics training facility of the Indiana Hoosiers's football program. It was dedicated on April 12, 1996, following a donation of $1.5 million from singer-songwriter John Mellencamp, to facilitate the project. The indoor practice facility contains a regulation-sized football field, featuring a Sportexe Momentum 41 artificial surface which was installed in 2007. The field can also accommodate field hockey, soccer, baseball, softball and golf.

The $6.5 million 96,129-square-foot (8,900 m2) training facility was financed through donations and pledges from local area alumni, businesses and philanthropists including Mellencamp and Bill Cook. Ratio Architects of Indianapolis was the primary architect firm for the building with Weddle Brothers Construction Company facilitating its construction.

The building also includes two full side-by-side, outdoor grass fields which are utilized by the football team for outdoor practices.

While the facility is not open to the public, it has previously been used for events including banquets, private events and staging for graduation ceremonies of Indiana University students.

References

Indiana Hoosiers
Indiana Hoosiers football
Indiana Hoosiers field hockey
1996 establishments in Indiana
Sports venues completed in 1996